Lower Pontnewydd railway station was a railway station in the village of Pontnewydd in Torfaen, South Wales, UK, originally opened by the Pontypool, Caerleon and Newport Railway.

History
The station was opened as "Pontnewydd" by the Pontypool, Caerleon and Newport Railway on 21 December 1874. The station closed to passengers on 9 June 1958, with the goods yard remaining in use until 25 January 1965.

The site was to the north of the overbridge on Station Road. It is now partially used as a caravan storage business. The twin track line remains in use.

When Cwmbran railway station was reopened by British Rail on 12 May 1986, it was at a site 300m to the south of Lower Pontnewydd.  The former station is on the Welsh Marches Line.

References

Notes

Sources

External links
Aerial image at britainfromabove.org.uk
Signal and track layout at the Signalling Record Society site
Station, to the right, on navigable 1947 O. S. map

Disused railway stations in Torfaen
Railway stations in Great Britain opened in 1874
Railway stations in Great Britain closed in 1917
Railway stations in Great Britain opened in 1919
Railway stations in Great Britain closed in 1958
Former Great Western Railway stations
Cwmbran